Boćki  (Bot’ky) is a village in Bielsk County, Podlaskie Voivodeship, in north-eastern Poland. It is the seat of the gmina (administrative district) called Gmina Boćki.

According to the 1921 census, the village was inhabited by 1.719 people, among whom 744 were Roman Catholic, 239 Orthodox, 11 Evangelical and 725 Mosaic. At the same time, 1.065 inhabitants declared Polish nationality, 44 Belarusian, 2 Russian and 608 Jewish. There were 305 residential buildings in the village.

The village has a population of 1,500.

References

Villages in Bielsk County
Podlachian Voivodeship
Belsky Uyezd (Grodno Governorate)
Białystok Voivodeship (1919–1939)
Belastok Region